EASA or Easa may refer to:
 European Union Aviation Safety Agency
 European Association of Social Anthropologists
 EASA (software)
 English Academy of Southern Africa 
 European Architecture Students Assembly
 Ismail Easa, Maldivian footballer 
 European Academy of Sciences and Arts